Ray Redshaw (born 23 December 1958) is an English former professional footballer.

Redshaw played for many teams which included Leeds United, Wigan Athletic, Hyde United, Salford City, Southport, Macclesfield Town, Northwich Victoria, Accrington Stanley, Chorley, Horwich RMI and in New Zealand with Papatoetoe.

Redshaw played at Wigan Athletic with the likes of Paul Jewell, Mike Newell and Steve Walsh in the mid 1980s and made his debut against West Brom in 1984.

Redshaw also represented England at C level.

Redshaw has two sons who became professional footballers; Mark and Jack.

References

Footballers from Salford
English footballers
Leeds United F.C. players
Hyde United F.C. players
Salford City F.C. players
Southport F.C. players
Northwich Victoria F.C. players
Wigan Athletic F.C. players
Macclesfield Town F.C. players
Papatoetoe AFC players
Accrington Stanley F.C. players
Chorley F.C. players
Leigh Genesis F.C. players
Rossendale United F.C. players
Radcliffe F.C. players
New Zealand association footballers
1958 births
Living people
Association football forwards